The 1993–94 EHF Women's Cup Winners' Cup was the eighteenth edition of the European competition for women's handball national cup champions, and the first one organized by EHF instead of IHF. It ran from September 25, 1993, to May 15, 1994.

TuS Walle-Bremen, a semifinalist in the previous European Cup, won its first European trophy and the second straight Cup Winners' Cup for Germany beating 1978 champion Ferencvárosi TC in the final. Lithuania and Macedonia made their debut in the competition as independent countries.

Results

References

Women's EHF Cup Winners' Cup
1993 in handball
1994 in handball